Kansas's 4th Senate district is one of 40 districts in the Kansas Senate. It has been represented by Democrat David Haley since 2001. It is the most Democratic-leaning Senate district in the state.

Geography
District 4 is based in Kansas City, covering the northern neighborhoods of the city in Wyandotte County.

The district is located entirely within Kansas's 3rd congressional district, and overlaps with the 32nd, 33rd, 34th, 35th, 36th, and 37th districts of the Kansas House of Representatives. It borders the state of Missouri, located across the Missouri River from part of that state's Kansas City.

Recent election results

2020

2016

2012

Federal and statewide results in District 4

References

4
Wyandotte County, Kansas